Herfast de Crépon was the brother of Gunnor, Duchess of Normandy, the wife of Richard I of Normandy. His parentage is unknown, but it is stated by Dudo of St. Quentin that the family was of noble Danish ancestry.

About 1015, he witnessed a grant of Gunnor to the abbey of Mont Saint-Michel.

Controversial Heresy Trial 
It has been suggested that he is identical to the Arfast who in December 1022 at the church of St. Croix, Orléans, before king Robert II of France at the trial of several canons accused of neo-Manachaeism, testified that though uninfluenced by their heresy he pretended to share their beliefs so as to gain knowledge that could be used to denounce them.  Public sentiment was so inflamed against the heresy that the king was forced to station queen Constance at the church door to prevent the crowd from immediately killing the heretics.  On their conviction, the majority were taken out of the church and burned.  Arfast then retired as a monk to the abbey of Saint-Père-en-Vallée, Chartres, to which he donated land.  Gunnor and her children Richard II of Normandy and Robert, archbishop of Rouen similarly made donations to this abbey.

Personal life 
He was progenitor of a great Norman family. By an unknown wife, Herfast was the father of Osbern, the steward under two of the dukes of Normandy, and of Ranulf, known from ducal charters. Herfast died before 22 August 1026 or 1027.

References
 

10th-century French people
Medieval Danish nobility
Medieval French nobility
10th-century Danish people